Mary Bronwyn Featherston  (born 1943) is an Australian interior designer and designer of child-friendly play and learning environments. She is known both for her furniture and design collaboration with Grant Featherston, as well as her work researching and designing educational spaces for children. Featherston was inducted into the Design Institute of Australia Hall of Fame in 1996. She is currently Adjunct Professor in the School of Architecture and Urban Design at RMIT University.

Background 
Featherston, née Currey, was born in London in 1943 and migrated to Australia with her parents in 1953.

She trained in interior design at RMIT University and worked as a designer for Mockridge, Stahle and Mitchell Architects in the mid sixties.

In 1965 she formed a professional and personal partnership with furniture designer Grant Featherston which lasted for over 40 years.

Work 
Featherston is most known for her work designing play and learning environments for children. Major projects include the furnishing of the National Gallery of Victoria, establishing the Children's Museum of Victoria in 1985.

Featherston was involved in the campaign to establish Community Child Care in 1973 and Reggio Emilia Australia Information Exchange in 1995.

Public collections 
National Gallery of Victoria, 8 works

Exhibitions 
Design for Life: Grant and Mary Featherston, Heide Museum, 30 June 7 October 2018. Curator/s: Kirsty Grant and Denise Whitehouse

Currently 8 works of art in the National Gallery of Victoria.

Awards 
 Design Institute of Australia Hall of Fame in 1996
 Member of the Order of Australia in 2020

References

External links 
 The Featherston Archive

1943 births
Living people
20th-century Australian women artists
20th-century Australian artists
21st-century Australian women artists
21st-century Australian artists
Australian interior designers
Academic staff of RMIT University
Members of the Order of Australia
English emigrants to Australia
RMIT University alumni